Exter is a  long river in Lower Saxony (district Schaumburg) and North Rhine-Westphalia (district Lippe), Germany. It flows into the Weser in Rinteln.

History 
The river arises from the eastern part of the district Lippe in the Teutoburg Forest / Egge Hills Nature Park. Its origin is in the municipality Barntrup, approximately one kilometre southwest of the northern district Alverdissen's centre, in an area used for agriculture.

It gave its name the municipality of Extertal (lit. Exter valley) that was founded newly in 1969.

See also
List of rivers of Lower Saxony
List of rivers of North Rhine-Westphalia

References

Rivers of Lower Saxony
Rivers of North Rhine-Westphalia
Rivers of Germany